Patreon is a membership platform that provides business tools for content creators to run a subscription service. It helps creators and artists earn a monthly income by providing rewards and perks to their subscribers. Patreon charges a commission of 9 to 12 percent of creators' monthly income, in addition to payment processing fees.

Patreon is used by YouTube videographers, webcomic artists, writers, podcasters, musicians, adult content creators, and other categories of creators who post regularly online. It allows artists to receive funding directly from their fans, or patrons, on a recurring basis or per work of art. The company is based in San Francisco.

History

Patreon was co-founded in May 2013 by developer Sam Yam and musician Jack Conte, who was looking for a way to make a living from his YouTube videos. They developed a platform that allowed 'patrons' to pay a set amount of money every time an artist created a work of art. The company raised $2.1 million in August 2013 from a group of venture capitalists and angel investors. In June 2014, Patreon raised a further $15 million in a series A round led by Danny Rimer of Index Ventures. In January 2016, the company closed on a fresh round of $30 million in a series B round, led by Thrive Capital, which put the total raised for Patreon at $47.1 million.

They signed up more than 125,000 "patrons" in their first 18 months. In late 2014, the website announced that patrons were sending over $1,000,000 per month to the site's content creators.

In March 2015, Patreon acquired Subbable, a similar voluntary subscription service created by the Green brothers, John and Hank Green, and brought over Subbable creators and contents, including CGP Grey, Destin Sandlin's Smarter Every Day, and the Green brothers' own CrashCourse and SciShow channels. The merger was consequent to an expected migration of payment systems with Amazon Payments that Subbable used.

In October 2015, the site was the target of a large cyber-attack, with almost 15 gigabytes of password data, donation records, and source code taken and published. The breach exposed more than 2.3 million unique e-mail addresses and millions of private messages. Following the attack, some patrons received extortion emails demanding Bitcoin payments in exchange for the protection of their personal information.

In January 2017, Patreon announced that it had sent over $100,000,000 to creators since its inception.

In May 2017, Patreon announced that it had over 50,000 active creators and 1 million monthly patrons, and was on track to send over $150 million to creators in 2017.

In June 2017, Patreon announced a suite of tools for creators to run membership businesses on the Patreon platform. Notable improvements included a customer relationship management system, a mobile app called Lens, and a service to set up exclusive livestreams.

In August 2018, Patreon announced the acquisition of Memberful, a membership services company.

In October 2021, Patreon confirmed they were looking into implementing cryptocurrencies and NFTs after creators expressed interests in having the opportunity to offer exclusive memberships and benefits to their patrons through a coin or token.

In March 2022, Patreon announced that they have more than 250,000 creators who are using the platform, and there are more than 8 million active patrons from 200+ countries.

In September 2022, Patreon announced they were laying off 80 people, representing about 17% of their staff.

Business model
Patreon users are grouped by content type, such as video/films, podcast, comedy, comics, games, and education. These content creators set up a page on the Patreon website, where patrons can choose to pay a fixed amount to a creator on a monthly basis. Alternatively, content creators can configure their page so that patrons pay every time the artist releases a new piece of art. A creator typically displays a goal that the ongoing revenue will go towards, and can set a maximum limit of how much they receive per month. Patrons can cancel their payment at any time. Creators typically provide membership benefits (commonly in the form of exclusive content or behind-the-scenes work) for their patrons, depending on the amount that each patron pays.

Patrons can unlock monetary tiers that increase the content type they see from the user. Several content creators on Patreon are also YouTubers. They can create content on multiple platforms, and while the YouTube videos may be available to the public, the patrons receive private content made exclusively for them in exchange for aiding the Patreon user's goal. Patreon takes a 5% commission on pledges. , the average pledge per patron was around $12, and a new patron pledged to a creator every 5.5 seconds.

, almost half of the artists on Patreon produce YouTube videos, while most of the rest are writers, webcomics artists, musicians, or podcasters. , Patreon's Community Guidelines allow nudity and suggestive imagery as long as they are clearly marked, but prohibit content that may be deemed pornographic or as glorifying sexual violence.

Unlike other online platforms such as YouTube and Facebook, which use trained algorithms to identify potentially inappropriate content, Patreon's trust and safety team monitors users and investigates complaints of Terms of Service violations.

Bans of specific users
In July 2017, far-right YouTube personality Lauren Southern was banned from Patreon over concerns about Génération Identitaire's blocking of NGO ships in the Mediterranean, ferrying migrants to Europe off the Libyan coast. A letter she received from Patreon said she was removed for "raising funds in order to take part in activities that are likely to cause loss of life," referring to an incident in May involving Southern, and the larger Defend Europe mission in July, which she covered on YouTube. Philosopher, writer, and podcast host Sam Harris, who also received contributions from patrons on the website, objected to Patreon's approach and announced that he would be leaving the platform because of it. Shortly thereafter Patreon deleted the account of It's Going Down, a left-wing news website, for allegedly doxing.

In September 2018, Patreon banned Turkish journalist-in-exile Kamil Maman after Turkey threatened to block the entire site in Turkey if the company did not comply. In an e-mail sent to Maman, Patreon said "This was not an easy decision for [us], as we are huge proponents of free speech, but it was a decision we made in order to best protect access to Turkish creators." Maman condemned Patreon for giving in to the demands of an autocratic regime.

In December 2018, Patreon banned Milo Yiannopoulos a day after he created an account and also banned Carl Benjamin because he used homophobic and racist slurs in a YouTube interview in February 2018. Benjamin claimed that Patreon had taken his words out of context and that "the video in question should not fall under Patreon's rules because it was on YouTube."

This ban was criticized by Sam Harris and some American libertarians, who have accused it of being politically motivated. Furthermore, Jordan Peterson announced a plan to launch an alternative service that will be safe from political interference, and jointly announced with Dave Rubin in a January 1, 2019, video that they will be leaving Patreon by January 15, 2019, as a direct response to its treatment of Carl Benjamin and has since effected that change.

Patreon banned comedian Owen Benjamin following alleged hate speech. Benjamin filed an arbitration claim for $2.2 million (later upped to $3.5 million) and told fans to file identical claims against Patreon as required by the Terms of Use in an attempt to pressure them into a settlement. Benjamin said that the suit(s) had a basis due to a disrupted economic relationship. Patreon launched a counter-suit against 72 individuals who filed arbitration claims and sought a preliminary injunction to stay all arbitration proceedings pending the outcome of its counter-suit. The injunction was denied, meaning that Patreon may be required to prefund the arbitration claims against itself up to $10,000 per claim. Patreon had previously changed its terms of service on January 1, 2020, to end the conditions under which the suits attempted by Benjamin's supporters (but not himself) occurred, as the lawsuits were filed on January 6. The terms-of-service update stated that only the person banned from the platform would be allowed to file a complaint and that any arbitration fees would have to be paid by the person or entity filing the complaint. The suits open the door to lawsuits from supporters of other Patreon users banned from the platform, with freelance journalist Lauren Southern preparing her suit.

Response to Russian invasion of Ukraine
During the 2022 Russian war in Ukraine, Patreon maintained their business in Russia despite international pressure on western companies operating in Russia to cease.

At the beginning of the Russian invasion of Ukraine, Patreon closed the largest Ukrainian account run by Comeback Alive fund (savelife.in.ua), which raised money for helping volunteers and veteran divisions, on the grounds that the raised money was explicitly used to purchase weapons. Patreon uploaded a blog post on the first day of the invasion explaining its reasoning and listing links to other Ukrainian charities.

Changes in content guidelines and terms of service
In December 2017, Patreon announced a service fee starting on December 18, 2017, where some fees would be charged to the patrons rather than all fees being paid by the creator. This caused a backlash from several creators, including some who saw members of their fanbase withdraw small pledges in response. Under the new payment model, a $1 pledge would have cost a patron $1.38, and a $5 pledge would have cost $5.50, representing a 38% and 10% rise respectively. Due to this backlash and the loss of many pledges for creators, Patreon announced that they would not be rolling out these changes, and apologized to their users.

In 2018, Patreon was accused of cracking down on ASMR (autonomous sensory meridian response) videos.

On October 24, 2020, Patreon announced that it would ban all accounts "that advance disinformation promoting the QAnon conspiracy theory."

Regarding adult content 
In March 2014, Patreon announced via email that creators of sexual content on their platform would no longer be allowed to use PayPal services through Patreon to fulfill subscription payments. In July 2016, Patreon emailed their content creators announcing that payments through PayPal would resume for adult-oriented creators. Those who worked within the "Not Safe For Work" categories on Patreon could accept payments through PayPal via PayPal's subsidiary Braintree. However, in October 2017, Patreon reverted its stance on NSFW content, introducing new restrictions. They published an expanded version of the community guidelines with a broader definition of sexual content, triggering a backlash from some adult content creators. A petition in protest of the changes gathered 1,800 signatures, which drew a response from Jack Conte.

In June 2018, Patreon suspended some creators who produced adult content.

See also

 Liberapay
 OnlyFans
 Convoz

References

External links
 

2013 establishments in California
American companies established in 2013
Companies based in San Francisco
Crowdfunding platforms of the United States
Financial services companies established in 2013
Internet properties established in 2013
Subscription services